Vegferð (Journey) is an Icelandic television comedy mini-series developed by Glassriver. It is written by Víkingur Kristjánsson and directed by Baldvin Zophoníasson and premiered on Stöð 2 on 4 April 2021. It is a six-part series that follows fictional versions of friends and actors Ólafur Darri and Víkingur on a road trip through Vestfirðir to reshape their longtime friendship.

Cast
Víkingur Kristjánsson as Víkingur
Ólafur Darri Ólafsson as Ólafur Darri
Þórunn Arna Kristjánsdóttir as herself
Pétur Ernir Svavarsson
Pálmi Gestsson as himself
Þröstur Leó Gunnarsson as himself
Elfar Logi Hannesson as himself
Þorsteinn Gunnarsson as father-in-law
Helga Vala Helgadóttir
Nicolas Bro as himself
Jonas Schmidt as himself
Aldís Amah Hamilton as Lovísa

References

External links

2020s Icelandic television series
Icelandic comedy television series
Icelandic-language television shows
Television shows set in Iceland
Stöð 2 original programming